Namur Lake 174B is an Indian reserve of the Fort McKay First Nation in Alberta, located within the Regional Municipality of Wood Buffalo. It is 105 kilometres northwest of Fort McMurray.

References

Indian reserves in Alberta